Jackpot is a 2009 Bengali film directed by Kaushik Ganguly. The film stars Hiran Chatterjee, Koyel Mallick, Rahul Banerjee, and Sohini Paul (the daughter of Tapas Paul). It was Paul's second film after her debut in Bow Barracks Forever.

Plot
The film is about a reality show organized by Star Ananda, where the two finalists, Arka from the hills and Dodo from Sundarbans Sajnekhali, are given two tasks to fulfill. Dodo is given the duty of a police constable at Bhawanipur police station while Arka is given the duty of a driver. They have three days and two nights to battle out and win the prize of Rs. 1 crore. The one who makes fewer mistakes wins the jackpot.

Anchor Suman Dey becomes the host, a runaway from a mental hospital. Mayhem begins when Piu's older sister and brother-in-law report at the Bhawanipur police station (where Dodo and Mithu are posted) and Arka learns of Piu's problems. As Arka and Dodo are in disguise, they use fake names to cover up their identity. Arka becomes Jackie and Dodo becomes Potla. Thus while Arka flees to the hills with Piu to fulfill his job and win the money, Dodo with Goldar and Mithu start chasing them, not knowing that Piu is actually with Arka. After much hue and fuss Arka manages to take Piu to her lost love (she was escaping only to find her lost love, Abhirup) and Dodo catches up with them.

Arka and Dodo are crowned champions. Arka donates the entire Rs. 50 lakh for Piu's medical expenses. Dodo donates his share of Rs. 50 lakh for the same noble cause. It is revealed that Dodo and Arka are best friends and Dodo had persuaded Arka to participate in the show. Mithu and Dodo become love birds, while Arka devotes his concentration to the orphaned, lonely and mentally stagnated Piu.

Cast
 Hiran as Arko
 Koel Mallick as Piyu 
 Rahul as Dodo
 Sohini Paul as Mithu
 Biswajit Chakraborty as police inspector (boro babu)
 Dev, in a special dance appearance for the remake of the song "Jibone Ki Pabona"

Soundtrack

See also
 Waarish
 Ek Mutho Chabi

References

External links
 
  www.telegraphindia.com preview

2009 films
Bengali-language Indian films
Films directed by Kaushik Ganguly
2000s Bengali-language films